Orla Jørgensen (25 May 1904 – 29 June 1947) was a male Danish racing cyclist who won a gold medal at the 1928 Summer Olympics with Henry Hensen and Leo Nielsen.

References

External links
Orla Jørgensen's profile at databaseOlympics
Denmark's first Olympic champions

1904 births
1947 deaths
Danish male cyclists
Olympic gold medalists for Denmark
Olympic cyclists of Denmark
Cyclists at the 1928 Summer Olympics
Olympic medalists in cycling
Cyclists from Copenhagen
Medalists at the 1928 Summer Olympics